The National Treatment Purchase Fund (NTPF) is an Irish government body which was established to decrease waiting lists in the Irish public healthcare system. 

The Fund was established under Statutory Instrument 179 - National Treatment Purchase Fund (Establishment) Order, 2004, and the Nursing Homes Support Scheme Act (2009). The NTPF reduced waiting times for procedures from between 2 and 5 years in 2002 to an average of 2.4 months in 2009.

See also
Healthcare in the Republic of Ireland

References

Healthcare in the Republic of Ireland